Alopoglossus romaleos is a species of lizard in the family Alopoglossidae. It is   endemic to Colombia.

References

Alopoglossus
Reptiles of Colombia
Endemic fauna of Colombia
Reptiles described in 1994
Taxa named by Dennis M. Harris
Taxobox binomials not recognized by IUCN